Malakai Ravulo (born 22 September 1983) is a Fijian rugby union player. He is a loose forward but spent most of his youth playing as a centre. He presently plays his rugby with the North Harbour rugby team in New Zealand.

In October 2010 Malakai was selected for the Fiji 2010 November tour of Europe.

External links
 

1983 births
Living people
Fijian rugby union players
Rugby union flankers
Fiji international rugby union players
Fijian expatriate rugby union players
Expatriate rugby union players in New Zealand
Expatriate rugby union players in Romania
Fijian expatriate sportspeople in New Zealand
Fijian expatriate sportspeople in Romania
North Harbour rugby union players
People from Tailevu Province
I-Taukei Fijian people